Hkakabo Razi (or ) is believed to be Myanmar's highest mountain. The -tall mountain is the highest mountain in Southeast Asia as well. It is located in the northern Myanmar state of Kachin in an outlying subrange of the Greater Himalayan mountain system near the border tripoint with India and China. Its highest status has recently been challenged by -tall  Gamlang Razi, located about  WSW on the Chinese border.

The peak is enclosed within Khakaborazi National Park. Above , the highest forest zone is alpine, different from the forest not only in kind but in history and origin.

Environmental protection
Hkakabo Razi was established as a natural reserve on January 30, 1996, and as a national park on November 10, 1998. The Khakaborazi National Park is the last stronghold for biodiversity in Myanmar. The extraordinarily rich flora and fauna, ranging from lowland tropical to alpine species still await proper research and identification. They have barely been studied, and the park remains an excellent center for field study for students of botany, geology, zoology, and geography.

A study was done by the Forest Department with the assistance of Wildlife Conservation Society of New York during 1997 and 1998. The results have been presented in ICIMOD sponsored Workshop "Sub-regional Consultation on Conservation of Hkakabo Razi Mountain Ecosystems in Eastern Himalayas", held in Putao, Myanmar during 25–29 October 1999. This was followed in 2001 with an international, interdisciplinary team of scientists from the California Academy of Sciences in San Francisco, National Geographic Society, Harvard University, the Chinese Academy of Sciences, and the Myanmar Forestry Ministry. On 11 September 2001, herpetologist Joseph Slowinski, team leader from California Academy of Sciences, was bitten by a venomous krait and died in the field.

In 2002–2003, P. Christiaan Klieger, an anthropologist from the California Academy of Sciences, and photographer Dong Lin retraced their previous steps and succeeded in making the first anthropological survey of the Hkakabo Razi region.  On foot, they reached the northernmost village in Myanmar, Tahaundam, which is inhabited by about 200 Khampa Tibetans, including mountaineer Nyama Gyaltsen (see below).

The region will shortly be opened to the general public through eco-tourism by the Myanmar authorities. The government is collecting information for development in that regard, and many scientific expeditions have been already accepted in the region.

Only a few Westerners ever made it to Mt. Hkakabo Razi, the National Park or anywhere close to it. Captain B.E.A. Pritchard was the first Westerner to visit the Alun Dung valley, in 1913.

Climbing history
Takashi Ozaki (Japan, 1951 – May 14, 2011) and Nyima Gyaltsen (aka "Aung Tse"; Myanmar) made the first ascent in 1996. Ozaki had attempted the mountain in 1995 but turned back due to bad weather. The route to basecamp is long (four weeks) and arduous through a dense rain forest with many unbridged stream crossings. The recentness of the first ascent can also be attributed to the policy that foreigners were not allowed into the area until 1993.

In 2013, the nearby peak of Gamlang Razi was climbed and measured at  using an advanced version of GPS, making it possibly the highest in Myanmar. Ozaki had confirmed Hkakabo's height as 5881 m, but he did not yet have the GPS equipment to measure the exact height of Hkakabo Razi.

In August 2014 an all-Burmese expedition took a new route up the north face. Two team-members, Ko Aung Myint Myat and Ko Wai Yan Min Thu, reached the summit on August 31 for the second ascent of the mountain, placing a flag, plaque and Buddha image at the summit. The climbers ran out of battery power right after reaching the summit, and radio contact was lost. After they failed to return to the lower camps, a rescue operation was launched. The search for the missing climbers continued into October. It involved a helicopter crash landing, leading to the death of one pilot and an 11-day survival trek by the other pilot and the passenger mountaineer.

In November 2014, a National Geographic Society / The North Face sponsored expedition set out to measure the height of Hkakabo Razi using the same equipment as the Gamlang Razi team. The 2014 group was led by Hilaree Nelson, and also included Mark Jenkins, Cory Richards, Renan Ozturk, Emily Harrington and Taylor Rees. They estimated that the summit was an additional  higher.

In August 2018 it was announced that three Myanmar mountaineers would ascend the mountain sometime that year, but for various reasons, the team postponed the climb until further notice.

See also

List of mountains in Myanmar
List of Southeast Asian mountains
Hkakaborazi National Park
Gamlang Razi

References

External links
 Ministry of Ecotourism
 Site with photographs
 Mt. Hkarkaborazi (Highest Mountain Peak in SE Asia) Part-1

 Mountains of Myanmar
 Mountains of Arunachal Pradesh
 International mountains of Asia
 India–Myanmar border
 Highest points of countries